Albert Mosley Hodges (19 April 1918 – 4 February 1965) was an Australian rules footballer who played for the Richmond Football Club and Hawthorn Football Club in the Victorian Football League (VFL).

Notes

External links 
		

1918 births
1965 deaths
Australian rules footballers from Victoria (Australia)
Richmond Football Club players
Hawthorn Football Club players